As You Like It is a 1991 film based on the play As You Like It by William Shakespeare. It was devised, written and directed by Christine Edzard and produced by Olivier Stockman and George Reinhart.

The music is by Michel Sanvoisin and the film stars James Fox as Jacques, plus Cyril Cusack, Andrew Tiernan, Celia Bannerman, Emma Croft as Rosalind, Griff Rhys Jones as Touchstone, Roger Hammond, Don Henderson and Miriam Margolyes.

Production
As You Like It was a very low budget production filmed on an empty plot of land near Sands Films studios in Rotherhithe in the docklands of east London, which at that time was only partially reconstructed. Some of the cast members were known in British and Irish TV and theatre, but none had a high international profile except for James Fox. The film follows director Christine Edzard's tradition of "working outside the artistic constraints...(of)...major commercial financing". In her version of As You Like It, set in an urban wasteland, "the weather is never kind",  and the exiled live in tents and cardboard boxes reminiscent of the scenes of homelessness which characterised Britain when Margaret Thatcher was Prime Minister . Relocating Shakespeare's original comedy to the corporate world of London, whose "blighted docklands" are a "trenchant condemnation of Thatcher's Britain", continues the engagement with "social malfeance and urban ills" that characterised the director's earlier films Little Dorrit (1987 film) and The Fool (1990).

The film's low budget of £800,000, short shooting period of only five weeks, the independence of Sands Films studio, and its art-house distribution are not the only factors that make it an avant-garde film. Besides its small and collaborative production team and non-commercial aims, As You Like It is an experimental, unconventional and challenging work which deliberately uses relocations in time and place to create a unique reproduction of Shakespeare's original play. Like Edzard's version of Charles Dickens' Little Dorrit (1987 film), this project uses the city as a metaphor, explores the complexities of double perspectives and focuses on societies at work. As the director explained though, the two films were also completely different. With Dickens "the truth of the character is in the nineteenth century, and the truth does not materialize until you start putting in all the detail", whereas, with Shakespeare, Edzard says "I don't believe that you can reach the sixteenth century in that sort of way. It's too remote: it would become an archaeological dig. The nineteenth century has a closeness to us in reproduction terms. The intention of the play is that it is a play and that it is meant to be rethought every time you do it. A film has to be as tightly rooted to its origins as is feasible, and it has to carry the message that the past has changed to us."

Edzard's philosophy explains the relocation of the film to the contemporary, urban setting of the 1990s, of the court to a corporate emporium and of the forest to a wasteland. The relocation brings the two worlds of the 1590s and 1990s together through a shared vision of "national blight", corruption, and a shabby shallowness, in both of which the existence of and reaction to "buskers, beggars and...squatters" were familiar. <ref>{{cite book |last1=Marriette |first1=Amelia |title=Urban Dystopias: Reapproaching Christine Edzard's As You Like It. In Burnett, M.T, Wray, R. (eds) Shakespeare, Film, Fin de Siecle. Palgrave Macmillan: London, 2000.|pages=73-88|doi=10.1057/9780230286795}}</ref>

ReceptionAllMovie.com'' described the film as a "modern-dress rendition of Shakespeare's famous "comedy"" which features more of the original dialogue than the 1936 film version. The reviewer suggested that while the "anachronistic modern settings" could be confusing for some viewers, others could enjoy "the interpretations...by some of the better performers" of British theatre in the 1990s.

References

External links
 
 

1991 films
20th-century British films